Mostafa Chendid is a Moroccan born Imam.  He received Danish citizenship in 2002.

Chendid, a former taxi-driver, is a member of the Islamic Society in Denmark where he functions as the spiritual tutor.  He is thought to be Ahmad Abu Laban's successor

References

External links 
 Translation of Weekendavisen interview into English

Living people
Danish imams
Danish people of Moroccan descent
Year of birth missing (living people)